Jason Philip Macendale, Jr. is a fictional character appearing in American comic books published by Marvel Comics.

Publication history
The character first appears in Machine Man #19 (Feb. 1981), created by writer Tom DeFalco and artist Steve Ditko.

From 1987 to 1997, Macendale initially wielded only the Hobgoblin identity and weaponry but the 1988-1989 Inferno crossover writer Gerry Conway had Macendale imbued with demonic powers by N'astirh. In addition to power over hellfire and increased strength and speed to far greater than the original Hobgoblin, these powers also disfigure Macendale so that his head is even more grotesque than the Hobgoblin mask, and ultimately alters his mind so that he was deluded into thinking that his appearance is normal. Macendale eventually succeeds in purging himself of his demonic powers and was later revamped again with cybernetic implants.

The character was killed off in Spider-Man: Hobgoblin Lives #1 in order to make room for Roderick Kingsley to assume the Hobgoblin mantle. Writer Roger Stern recounted being initially uncertain of how to resolve the situation of there being two Hobgoblins:

Fictional character biography

Jason Macendale was a mercenary who was recruited out of college and trained by the CIA and various para-military organizations. Considered a liability due to his violent nature and amoral personality, this rejection turned Macendale to be a mercenary and ultimately a costumed terrorist. He adopted the Jack O'Lantern alter ego, engaging in combat with Machine Man as his first opponent followed by Spider-Man for the first time.

Macendale was later hired to retrieve the Hobgoblin's lost battle van, pulling off the mission successfully despite Spider-Man's untimely appearance. When Flash Thompson insulted the Hobgoblin on national television which had incurred the Hobgoblin's wrath to frame Thompson so that criminal enemies might target Flash instead, Macendale subsequently broke Thompson out of jail, thinking he was doing the Hobgoblin a favor. But Macendale ruined the Hobgoblin's plans to operate "under the radar" while Thompson was in custody. When the Kingpin temporarily abdicated being the organized crime's head on the eastern seaboard and a resulting gang war tore New York City apart, Macendale wished to increase his underworld status and formed an alliance with the Hobgoblin. The Hobgoblin ultimately double-crossed Macendale when the two were fleeing a horde of police officers. Macendale vowed revenge, ultimately hiring the Foreigner to have the Hobgoblin killed. After his co-conspirator's supposed death, all known copies of Goblin weapons and costumes were handed over to Macendale who took over the Hobgoblin identity in order to steal notoriety within the supervillain community. However, Macendale was exposed by the Kingpin's organization and fought a battle against Spider-Man which was meant to prove his abilities but was foiled. To add to the embarrassment, Spider-Man was obviously drunk when they fought and still won.

Deciding he needed abilities like the original Green Goblin and Hobgoblin if he was to have a similar reputation, Macendale attempted to steal the Goblin secret formula for superhuman strength. After failing to do so, he intimated Harry Osborn by threatening Osborn's loved ones for wanting the Goblin formula, resulting in a confrontation between himself and the second Green Goblin where Macendale was overcame. During a demonic invasion of Manhattan, Macendale felt dejected and humiliated. Offering to sell his soul in exchange for a demon's power, the demon N'astirh fused a demon to Macendale. Enhanced by the demon's power but horrified as his handsome face transformed into a demonic one, Macendale blamed his suffering on Spider-Man and Osborn. He hunted Spider-Man down for revenge. With his demonic powers, Macendale defeated Spider-Man easily but Mary Jane Watson intervened before he could deliver the killing blow.

Having finally been made into the notorious supervillain he hoped to be at the cost of his humanity, Macendale put his personal enmity for Spider-Man aside and used his demonic powers to be a top contract killer. He offered his mercenary services to Hammerhead and Tombstone to eliminate Robbie Robertson but is stopped by Spider-Man and Puma. Macendale next conspired with Carrion to eliminate Spider-Man before his co-conspirator ultimately nearly took both villains out instead. Macendale goes after Doctor Strange but an illusion spell is cast to try to calm the monstrous man/demon and Macendale sees his true face in reflections of himself. Macendale was later stiff-armed by Doctor Octopus into joining the Sinister Six's second incarnation which twice tried to take over the world, failing due to counter measures by Spider-Man, the Hulk, Ghost Rider, the Fantastic Four and many more heroes.

As an independent mercenary and criminal, Macendale would clash with many other heroes, including Darkhawk, and Sleepwalker. However, the insane demon who shared his body acts dominate but gets destabilized long enough for Macendale to briefly regain his sanity during conflicts with Spider-Man and other heroes; once involving Moon Knight, and twice involving the two Ghost Riders (Danny Ketch and Johnny Blaze). Macendale ultimately expelled the demon referred to as the Demogoblin out of his body. Despite Richard Fisk want vengeance for Ned Leeds, he has a reluctant partnership with Fisk but later tried to eliminate the Blood Rose and the new Kingpin but is foiled by Spider-Man. In a rare event, Macendale teamed up with Spider-Man to defeat the duo of Demogoblin and Doppelganger. Macendale was hired by the Foreigner to assassinate Moon Knight and Nick Katzenberg only to be stopped by Moon Knight and Spider-Man, and turned over to the authorities. Macendale obtained Kraven the Hunter's strength formula, which enabled him to easily defeat his demonic doppelganger Demogoblin who then died saving a young child in battle.

Macendale was defeated once more by Spider-Man along with Coldheart during an attempt to kidnap Macendale's long-lost son. However, Macendale's reunion would be an unhappy one as Macendale attempted (unsuccessfully) to use his son as a hostage to avoid going back to jail. He would remain in jail for some time before being freed by Gaunt, combating against the second Spider-Man. In exchange for doing Gaunt's bidding, the scientist turned Macendale into a cyborg such as the removal of Macendale's left eye with a new high-tech cybernetic eye. He failed and was once again arrested.

Considered "just a criminal" by Spider-Man, Macendale was viewed as a typical (sociopathic) thug who is not much of a threat as his predecessor and Norman Osborn in comparison.

Macendale went on trial for his many crimes and found guilty on several counts (including convictions for the original Hobgoblin's acts), disgustingly responding by revealing that Leeds was his predecessor. His continued testimony leads Spider-Man recounting encounters with the original Hobgoblin, and thus realized that Ned cannot possibly be the supervillain due to lack of powers (despite being killed when Macendale paid the Foreigner). Despite Macendale being in prison, Roderick Kingsley broke into prison, taunting him as an unworthy successor and murdered Macendale.

A later version of Jack O'Lantern (initially misidentified as Macendale) is captured by S.H.I.E.L.D.; this individual used several false aliases including Jason Macendale, Maguire Beck (Mysterio's cousin), and Mad Jack (Daniel Berkhart). Jack O'Lantern's true identity was never revealed but it was not any of the aliases he was using.

Powers and abilities
Jason Macendale originally possessed no superhuman powers, but used similar paraphernalia to the Hobgoblin and the Green Goblin; both his Jack O'Lantern and Hobgoblin personas used a rocket-powered glider, pumpkin bombs, and gauntlet blasters. During the time in which a demon was grafted to him, he had superhuman strength, speed, and agility, as well as hellfire powers enabling him to create weapons and gliders at will. It is implied that his demonic abilities allowed him to create organic fibers strong enough to bind a normal person. After acquiring Kraven the Hunter's formula, Macendale had enhanced his strength, speed, stamina, durability, reflexes, and agility to superhuman levels, thanks to anomalies in his blood left over when he and Demogoblin were one, but this formula's effects seemed to have later wore off. His later cybernetically enhanced body thanks to Mendel Stromm further increased his strength, speed, reflexes, durability, and stamina. Macendale had extensive military training in hand-to-hand combat, martial arts, espionage, and knowledge of conventional weaponry. He often used conventional military weapons. When he adopted the Hobgoblin persona, he was able to make improvements to the Goblin gilder's maneuverability by utilizing skills he gained from his master's degrees in both mechanical engineering and physics. Macendale was also a sociopath and a sadist, which led to his dishonorable discharge from the military.

In other media

Television
An amalgamated incarnation of the Hobgoblin named Jason Phillips appears in Spider-Man: The Animated Series, voiced by Mark Hamill. This version is a composite character of Jason Macendale and Roderick Kingsley. After several appearances as the Hobgoblin, he introduces himself as a philanthropist in "Rocket Racer" as he begins dating Felicia Hardy. In "Goblin War!", Phillips becomes engaged to Hardy while forming an uneasy alliance with the Kingpin and clashing with both Spider-Man and the Green Goblin over a time dilation accelerator as the Hobgoblin. Phillips is later arrested after Felicia discovers his true identity.

Video games
 Jason Macendale as the Hobgoblin appears as a boss in Spider-Man: Return of the Sinister Six. This version is a member of the titular team.
 Jason Macendale as the Hobgoblin appears in The Amazing Spider-Man vs. The Kingpin.
 Jason Macendale as Jack O'Lantern appears as a mini-boss in Spider-Man. He is part of the Ravencroft Prison for the Insane level in the Sega Genesis version and in the Coney Island level in the SNES version.
 Jason Macendale as Jack O'Lantern appears as a boss in Spider-Man Unlimited, voiced by Travis Willingham.
 Jason Macendale as Jack O'Lantern appears as an enhanced costume for the Green Goblin in Marvel Heroes.

Merchandise
The demonic version of Jason Macendale appears in the Spider-Man Classics line, which was reworked for the Marvel Legends Sinister Six set and repainted into a Demogoblin figure.

References

External links
 Hobgoblin (Jason Macendale) at Marvel.com
 Jason Macendale Jr. (Earth-616) at Marvel Wiki
 
 Jack O'Lantern (Jason Macendale)  at SpiderFan.org
 
 Hobgoblin IV (Jason Macendale)  at SpiderFan.org

Fictional characters from Boston
Marvel Comics supervillains
Fictional characters missing an eye
Fictional characters who have made pacts with devils
Fictional characters with superhuman durability or invulnerability
Fictional mercenaries in comics
Fictional Central Intelligence Agency personnel
Marvel Comics cyborgs
Comics characters introduced in 1981
Characters created by Steve Ditko
Fictional goblins
Spider-Man characters
Characters created by Tom DeFalco
Hobgoblin (comics)
Marvel Comics characters who can move at superhuman speeds
Marvel Comics characters with superhuman strength
Marvel Comics military personnel
Marvel Comics mutates